Tsirangtoe Gewog (Dzongkha: རྩི་རང་སྟོད་) is a gewog (village block) of Tsirang District, Bhutan.

References

Gewogs of Bhutan
Tsirang District